Rosa Vicenta Montserrat Coscolín Figueras (28 October 1922 – 4 December 2005) known professionally as Gloria Lasso was a Spanish-born canción melódica singer, long based in France. In the 1950s, she was one of the major competitors to Dalida.

Born in Vilafranca del Penedès (Barcelona) in Catalonia, Spain, she achieved a degree of fame and success in the 1950s and 1960s, with songs such as Amour, castagnettes et tango (1955), Etranger au paradis (1956, a French version of Stranger in paradise by Tony Bennett), Buenas noches mi amor (1957) and Bon voyage (1958).

Eventually superseded by Dalida, she moved to Mexico, but attempted a comeback to France in 1985 performing at the Paris Olympia. She was reportedly married six times.

She died from a myocardial infarction, aged 83, at her Cuernavaca, Mexico home.

Chart positions (France)

Albums
1956 – Le tour de chant de Gloria Lasso – #10

Singles
1955 – Étrangère au Paradis – #2
1956 – Dolorès – #7
1956 – Toi mon démon – #8
1956 – Mandolino – #11
1956 – Amour, castagnettes et tango – #5
1956 – La fête Brésilienne – #41
1956 – Malaguena – #45
1956 – La cueillette du coton – #16
1956 – Lisbon Antigua – #3
1956 – Adieu Lisbonne – #20
1957 – Bambino – #6
1957 – Le torrent – #3
1957 – Canastos (duet with Luis Mariano) – #3
1957 – Amour perdu – #18
1957 – Buenas noches mi amor – #7
1957 – Marianne – #12
1957 – Padre Don José – #46
1957 – Histoire d'un amour – #17
1958 – Gondolier – #10
1958 – Bon voyage – #15
1958 – Diana – #10
1958 – Ça c'est l'amour – #27
1958 – Sarah – #46
1958 – Je t'aimerai, t'aimerai – #22
1959 – Bonjour, chéri – #22
1959 – Vénus – #1 (for 5 weeks)
1959 – La chanson d'Orphée – #6
1959 – Sois pas fâché – #21
1960 – Valentino – #5
1960 – Adios Muchachos / Acercate Mas 
1961 – Pépito – #15
1961 – Le goût de la violence – #32
1961 – Oui devant Dieu – #56
1962 – Et maintenant – #17
1962 – Magali – #35

References

External links
 
 InfoDisc Charts in France

1922 births
2005 deaths
People from Alt Penedès
People from Cuernavaca
Spanish women singers
French-language singers

20th-century Spanish women
Spanish expatriates in France